Jean Joseph Dussault (1769–1824) was a French librarian, journalist and literary critic.

1769 births
1824 deaths
Librarians from Paris
French literary critics
Journalists from Paris